Oil's Well (a pun on "all's well") is a video game published by Sierra On-Line in 1983. The game was written for the Atari 8-bit family by Thomas J. Mitchell. Oil's Well is similar to the 1982 arcade game Anteater, re-themed to be about drilling for oil instead of a hungry insectivore. Ports were released in 1983 for the Apple II and Commodore 64, in 1984 for ColecoVision and the IBM PC (as a self-booting disk), then in 1985 for MSX and the Sharp X1. A version with improved visuals and without Mitchell's involvement was released for MS-DOS in 1990.

Gameplay

The player collects oil for a drilling operation by moving the drill head through a maze using four directional control buttons. The drill bit is trailed by a pipeline connecting it to the base. Subterranean creatures populate the maze; the head can destroy the creatures, but the pipeline is vulnerable. As the player traverses the maze, the pipe grows longer, but pressing a button quickly retracts the head. There are 8 levels to play through.

Reception
Dave Stone reviewed the game for Computer Gaming World, and stated that "The action's well-paced, the difficulty progressive. While getting to a higher level is somewhat dependent on getting the right breaks — good eye-hand coordination, timing, and strategy are essential."

Ahoy! stated that while the Commodore version's graphics and sounds were only "serviceable; gameplay is, in my experience, unique ... Recommended". InfoWorld called the IBM PCjr version "a clever, basic game".

The U.S. gaming magazine Computer Games awarded Oil's Well the 1984 Golden Floppy Award for Excellence, in the category of "Maze Game of the Year."

Legacy
Despite already being a clone of Anteater, several additional clones borrowed the theme of Oil's Well: Pipeline Run for the Commodore 64 in 1990 and Oilmania for the Atari ST in 1991.

References

External links
Oil's Well at Atari Mania

Commodore 64 video at archive.org
Review in GAMES magazine

1983 video games
Apple II games
Atari 8-bit family games
ColecoVision games
Commodore 64 games
DOS games
Maze games
MSX games
Sierra Entertainment games
Video game clones
Video games developed in the United States